R. M. Pitchappan or Ramasamy Pitchappan, Ph.D.,  F.A.Sc.,  F.A.M.S. (born 1946), is an  Indian  biologist known for his studies on Immunogenetics and infectious diseases. He was a Professor in the School of Biological Sciences (SBS) of the Madurai Kamaraj University (MKU). In addition, Pitchappan held the positions of Director, Educational Medical Research Centre, Director-Research, Chettinad University, Chennai, and Adjunct Professor,  ICMR Andaman Nicobar Islands. He also held the position of the vice-president of the Nilgiri Adivasi Welfare Association in Kotagiri, Nilgiris, and as an advisor to the ancient DNA programme of Government of Tamil Nadu.

Contribution in Science
Pitchappan has used an integrative approach and new DNA technologies to explore infectious illnesses and human population genetics. His discoveries include the genomic predisposition for leprosy, tuberculosis susceptibility, and the first out of Africa emigration of modern man through India. His publications explained the pre-Aryan origins of the Brokpa, a Dardic-speaking tribe from Dah-Hanu, Leh, and Ladak as well as the beginnings of the caste system in India. As several male-mediated migrations from various places came together in one location, they merged into caste-like clans. To his credit, he has delivered keynote addresses and symposium speeches at UNESCO, numerous international congresses on  HLA and immunology, as well as World Tamil Conferences. He has also published more than 100 research articles in peer-reviewed journals.

Awards and recognition
Pitchappan's awards and recognition include:
 1980: Visiting Scientist to the laboratory of Director Prof. Jean Dausset, Nobel Laureate
 1985: Outstanding Young person award 
 1995: Jaycees of Tamil Nadu and  Lancet's Investigator Award
 2002: IIH-ICMR, Mumbai, Elected Fellow of Indian Academy of Sciences, Bangalore, India
 2002: Elected Fellow of National Academy of Medical Sciences, New Delhi, India
 2003: Member, International Advisory Committee, 7th Asia-Oceania Histocompatibility workshop, Karuizawa, Japan
 2003: International Collaborative Research Grants: Commissioin of European Communities, The  Wellcome Trust Centre, London, UK;  INSERM (France)- ICMR Grant on  TB, H.M.Bhatia Memoraial Oration Award - ICMR-IIH, Mumbai, Life Time Achievement Award - Association of Microbiologists of India - Tamil Nadu.

References 

1946 births
Living people
20th-century Indian biologists